The Shire of Donnybrook Balingup is a local government area in the South West region of Western Australia, about  southeast of Bunbury and about  south of the state capital, Perth.

History

The Shire of Donnybrook–Balingup was established on 26 March 1970 with the amalgamation of the Shire of Donnybrook and the Shire of Balingup. The merged shire initially retained the Donnybrook name, but adopted the Donnybrook-Balingup name on 17 July 1970. The new council was administered from Donnybrook.

The Shire of Donnybrook–Balingup is also home to a number of heritage-listed historic properties including Ferndale Homestead and Southampton homestead.

Wards
In 2001 the Shire abolished wards and all nine councillors represent the entire shire.

Prior to this, four wards made up the council:
Donnybrook (including Argyle, Irishtown and Beelerup)
Preston (area east of Donnybrook including Lowden, Mumballup and Noggerup)
Central (including Kirup, Upper Capel, Brazier, Newlands, Brookhampton and Thompsons Brook)
Balingup (including Mullalyup, Grimwade, Upper Balingup, Southampton and Ferndale[Lower Balingup])

Towns and localities
The towns and localities of the Shire of Donnybrook-Balingup with population and size figures based on the most recent Australian census:

Heritage-listed places

As of 2023, 113 places are heritage-listed in the Shire of Donnybrook–Balingup, of which twelve are on the State Register of Heritage Places, among them the Southampton homestead.

References

External links
 

Donnybrook